Bún riêu is a traditional Vietnamese soup of clear stock and rice vermicelli. There are several varieties of bún riêu, including bún riêu cua (minced crab), bún riêu cá (fish) and bún riêu ốc (snail).

Bún riêu cua is served with tomato broth and topped with minced freshwater crab. In this dish, various freshwater paddy crabs are used, including the brown paddy crab found in rice paddies in Vietnam. The crabs are cleaned to remove dirt and sand, then pounded together (with the shell still on) into a fine paste. This paste is then strained — the liquid becoming the base for the soup along with tomato, and the solids used as the basis for crab cakes. Other ingredients for this dish include tamarind paste, fried tofu, mẻ or giấm bỗng (kinds of rice vinegar), quả dọc (Garcinia multiflora Champ.), annatto seeds (hạt điều màu) to redden the broth, huyết (congealed pig's blood), split water spinach stems, shredded banana flower, rau kinh giới (Elsholtzia ciliata), spearmint, perilla, bean sprouts and chả chay (vegetarian sausage). This dish is rich in nutrition: calcium from the ground crab shells, iron from the congealed pig's blood, and vitamins and fiber from the vegetables.

Bún riêu has a fresh sour flavor, so Vietnamese like to enjoy it in summer. There are many restaurants in Vietnam that sell this dish.

Ingredients 
 Paddy crabs (crab meat and crab roe)
 Tomato
 Egg
 Souring agents like Garcinia multiflora (quả dọc), dracontomelon (quả sấu), tamarind (quả me), starfruit (quả khế), rice vinegar (mẻ or giấm bỗng)
 Onion
 Fried tofu 
 Accompanying greens: sliced banana flowers (hoa chuối thái nhỏ), rau muống
Herbs: perilla (tía tô), Vietnamese balm (kinh giới)

See also
 List of crab dishes
 List of seafood dishes
 Noodle soup

References

External links

 Kỳ lạ... bún riêu cua LANHUONG, Băng Sơn Hà Nội mới 11:16 15/10/2007 

Vietnamese soups
Crab dishes
Seafood dishes
Vietnamese words and phrases
Noodle soups
Vietnamese noodle dishes